Neobus is the name of two separate and unrelated bus manufacturers:

 Neobus (Serbia)
 Neobus (Brazil)